Grzegorz Paweł Kaliciak (born 10 March 1975 in Kędzierzyn-Koźle) is a Polish footballer who plays as a defender for Start Bogdanowice.

References

External links
 
 

1975 births
Living people
People from Kędzierzyn-Koźle
Polish footballers
Poland international footballers
Association football defenders
Wisła Kraków players
Sint-Truidense V.V. players
Pogoń Szczecin players
Szczakowianka Jaworzno players
Zagłębie Sosnowiec players
Ekstraklasa players
Sportspeople from Opole Voivodeship
20th-century Polish people
21st-century Polish people